Lawrence, New York may refer to:
Lawrence, Nassau County, New York, a village
Lawrence, St. Lawrence County, New York, a town